Sound the Alarm is the eleventh studio album by The Dawn, released in 2009. It is the band's first album with the new guitarist Kenneth Ilagan. Five of the album's tracks were produced by Raimund Marasigan, the other five by Ariz Guinto. Marasigan also helped with musical arrangement, especially with the six songs composed by the bass guitar player Buddy Zabala. Pro Tools was used in making half of the songs on the album, a new method for the band. This is the only album to feature guitarist Kenneth Ilagan.

Track listing

Singles
 "Hatak"

Personnel
 Jett Pangan - vocals
 JB Leonor - drums, keyboards
 Kenneth Ilagan - guitars
 Buddy Zabala - bass guitar

References

The Dawn (band) albums
2009 albums